Sarah Castle is an American Paralympic wheelchair basketball player and swimmer.

Biography
Castle was born in 1984 in Denver, Colorado. In 2002, she won a silver medal at Swimming World championships while in 2005 she won a gold one at the Americas Cup. She also got a gold medal at the Osaka Cup which was hosted at Osaka, Japan and was a two-time gold medalist at Parapan American Games in 2007 and 2011 respectively. Besides being a gold medalist in those events, she also won gold at IWBF World Championships in 2010 and was awarded another one at 2008 Summer Paralympics. Besides winning golds she also won another silver medal at IWBF World Championships in 2006 and got another silver at the 2000 Summer Paralympics for  breaststroke. Castle was also a four-time NCAA National Champion from 2002 to 2008 (except for 2005 and 2007 where she wasn't awarded that honour).

References

1984 births
Living people
Sportspeople from Denver
Paralympic wheelchair basketball players of the United States
Paralympic gold medalists for the United States
Paralympic silver medalists for the United States
American women's wheelchair basketball players
American female breaststroke swimmers
Illinois Fighting Illini Paralympic athletes
Paralympic swimmers of the United States
Medalists at the 2000 Summer Paralympics
Medalists at the 2004 Summer Paralympics
Medalists at the 2008 Summer Paralympics
Paralympic medalists in wheelchair basketball
Paralympic medalists in swimming
Swimmers at the 2000 Summer Paralympics
Swimmers at the 2004 Summer Paralympics
Wheelchair basketball players at the 2008 Summer Paralympics
Wheelchair basketball players at the 2012 Summer Paralympics
21st-century American women
Medalists at the 2007 Parapan American Games
Medalists at the 2011 Parapan American Games
20th-century American women